Melvin Edward Alton "Turk" Murphy (December 16, 1915 – May 30, 1987) was an American trombonist and bandleader, who played traditional and Dixieland jazz.

Biography
He was born in Palermo, California, United States. Murphy served in the Navy during World War II, during which he played and recorded with Lu Watters and Bunk Johnson. In 1952, he headed Turk Murphy's Jazz Band, which included pianist Wally Rose, clarinetist Bob Helm, banjoist Dick Lammi, and tubaist Bob Short. They played at the Italian Village at Columbus and Lombard in San Francisco's North Beach. The band appeared on The Ed Sullivan Show twice, in 1959 and 1965. In 1979, Robert Schulz began an eight-year stint with the band. Other notable band members included trumpeters Don Kinch and Leon Oakley; pianists Pete Clute, Don Keeler, and Ray Skjelbred; banjoist Carl Lunsford, tuba and trombonist Bill Carroll, singers Pat Yankee and Jimmy Stanislaw.

Murphy was the singer for the 1971 Sesame Street cartoon shorts, "The Alligator King" and "No. 9 Martian Beauty". They were animated and produced by his friend Bud Luckey. Murphy arranged and performed on many of Luckey's other Sesame Street animated shorts. He was friend of trombonist and Disney animator Ward Kimball, who created many memorable caricatures of Murphy and Charles Addams, creator of the Addams Family.

Murphy's band played his nightclub, Earthquake McGoon's, which opened in 1960 and moved three times before closing in 1984. In January 1987, he played Carnegie Hall. He died on May 30, 1987.

Discography
 1950 San Francisco Jazz, Vol. 1 (Good Time Jazz)
 1950 In Hollywood
 1951 San Francisco Jazz, Vol. 2 (Good Time Jazz)
 1952 Turk Murphy with Claire Austin (Good Time Jazz)
 1953 Barrelhouse Jazz (Columbia)
 1954 When the Saints Go Marching In (Columbia)
 1954 Music of Jelly Roll Morton (Columbia)
 1955 Dancing Jazz (Columbia)
 1956 New Orleans Jazz Festival (Columbia)
 1957 New Orleans Shuffle (Columbia)
 1957 George Lewis & Turk Murphy at Newport (Verve)
 1957 Music for Losers (Verve)
 1958 Turk Murphy at Easy Street (Verve)
 1958 Live at Easy Street, Vol. 1 (Dawn Club)
 1959 Turk Murphy at the Round Table (Roulette)
 1959 Music for Wise Guys and Boosters (Roulette)
 1962 Let the Good Times Roll
 1972 In Concert, Vol. 1 (GHB)
 1972 Turk Murphy and His San Francisco Jazz Band, Vol. 2 (GHB)
 1972 In Concert, Vol. 2 (GHB)
 1972 Turk Murphy (GHB)
 1972 Turk Murphy and His San Francisco Jazz Band, Vol. 1 (GHB)
 1972 Turk Murphy's Jazz Band (Merrymakers)
 1973 Frisco Jazz Band, Live! (MPS)
 1973 The Earthquake McGoon Recordings (Merrymakers)
 1980 A Natural High (Bainbridge)
 1986 Concert in the Park (Merrymakers)
 1986 San Francisco Memories (Merrymakers)
 1986 Southern Stomps (Lake)
 1987 Turk at Carnegie (Stomp Off)
 1995 San Francisco Jazz (Merrymakers)
 1995 Turk Murphy's San Francisco Jazz Band (Merrymakers)
 1995 Sentimental Journeys (Merrymakers)
 1995 Live from the Rathskellar, Vol. 2 (Merrymakers)
 1995 Live from the Rathskellar, Vol. 1 (Merrymakers)
 1998 Live at Carson Hot Springs 
 2000 Recorded Live at the Cinegrill: 1950
 2006 Turk's DeLight (Jasmine)

References

Other sources
 Richard Cook, Jazz Encyclopedia,  London 2007, p. 453

External links 

Virtual Museum of San Francisco entry

1915 births
1987 deaths
American jazz trombonists
Male trombonists
Dixieland jazz musicians
People from Butte County, California
Singers from California
American jazz singers
United States Navy personnel of World War II
20th-century American musicians
20th-century American singers
20th-century trombonists
Jazz musicians from California
20th-century American male musicians
American male jazz musicians
Yerba Buena Jazz Band members
Columbia Records artists
Verve Records artists
Stomp Off artists
Jazzology Records artists
Roulette Records artists
MPS Records artists
Good Time Jazz Records artists
Burials at Cypress Lawn Memorial Park